Eze Nri Jiọfọ I was the fifth king of Nri Kingdom after succeeding Eze Nri Ọmalọ. He reigned from 1300–1390 CE.

References

Nri-Igbo
Nri monarchs
Kingdom of Nri
14th-century monarchs in Africa